Jazz Hamilton is a Puerto Rican saxophonist, musical director, and composer. Known for his recordings of classical, jazz, Latin jazz, smooth jazz and salsa.

Music career
Hamilton was born in Caguas, Puerto Rico. He has toured all over the world as lead alto sax player for artists such as Tito Puente and Giovanni Hidalgo, as well as performing with Sammy Davis Jr., Hilton Ruiz, Red Rodney. He was musical director for Marvin Santiago, Domingo Quiñones and Andy Montañez. In 1990 he recorded his first solo album, Solar Rain, followed by Fantasy, Love in D Minor, and Inolvidable.

In 2000 he toured as Hamilton y Las Estrellas Del Pueblo, a group that attempts to revive the traditional salsa music of the 1960s–1980s. In 2008 the album Hamilton Y Las Estrellas Del Pueblo was released. In 2008 his album My Soul was featured on the cover and main story page of Latin Beat Magazine, August edition

In 2006 he became executive producer for the TV talk show Elizabeth En Tu Agenda, presented by his wife, Elizabeth Hernández, which broadcast weekly on 3 different networks, including Telemundo in the large Central Florida market.

References

External links 
 Official website

American jazz saxophonists
American male saxophonists
American television personalities
Smooth jazz saxophonists
Living people
1965 births
People from Caguas, Puerto Rico
21st-century American saxophonists
21st-century American male musicians
American male jazz musicians